Ashkar Saudan is an Indian actor who predominantly work in Malayalam cinema. He made his acting debut through the commercially successful movie Ivar Vivahitharayal directed by Saji Surendran starring Jayasurya in 2009.

Career
He started his career as an actor in the movie Ivar Vivahitharayal directed by Saji Surendran and later played the role in Mithram directed by Jespal Shanmugham in 2014. He also appeared in several movies like Kolamas, Moonam Pralayam, Ennodu Para I Love You Ennu, Mere Pyare Deshvasiyom and Vallikkettu.

Filmography

References

External links
 
 

Indian male film actors
Year of birth missing (living people)
Living people
21st-century Indian male actors